Events in the year 1897 in Belgium.

Incumbents
Monarch: Leopold II
Prime Minister: Paul de Smet de Naeyer

Events

 10 May – Brussels International Exposition opens
 28 July – Prime Minister of the United Kingdom gives notification of his country's intention to withdraw from the Anglo-Belgian Treaty of Commerce and Navigation (1862), to come into effect one year later.
 16 August – Belgian Antarctic Expedition sets sail from Antwerp
 8 November – Brussels International Exposition closes
 16 December – Charles-Gustave Walravens appointed bishop of Tournai

Publications
Exhibitions
 Camille Lemonnier, Alphonse Wauters, and Armand Heins, Le Palais de la ville de Bruxelles à l'Exposition universelle de 1897

Books
 Biographie Nationale de Belgique, vol. 14.
 Grant Allen, Cities of Belgium (London, G. Richards)
 Guido Gezelle, Rijmsnoer
 Gustave Kahn, Limbes de lumières, illustrated by Georges Lemmen (Brussels, Edmond Deman)
 Désiré-Joseph Mercier, Les Origines de la psychologie contemporaine
 Emile Vandervelde, Le question agraire en Belgique

Births
 1 January – Albert De Vleeschauwer, politician (died 1971)
 24 January – Fernand Ledoux, actor (died 1994)
 29 January – Honoré Vlamynck, footballer (died 1974)
 11 April – Paul Graeffe, bobsledder (died 1957)
 7 May – Marcel Maas, pianist (died 1950)
 11 May – Joris Minne, artist (died 1988)
 2 June – Léon Trulin, intelligence agent (died 1915)
 8 June – Domien Jacob, gymnast (died 1984)
 19 June – Ernest Casimir-Lambert, bobsledder (died 1931)
 1 August – Camil Van Hulse, pianist (died 1988)
 25 August – Léoncé Oleffe, athlete (died 1972)
 12 September – Albert Wyckmans, cyclist (died 1995)
 4 November – Paul Finet, politician (died 1965)
 5 November – Paul Kronacker, politician (died 1994)
 24 November
 Lode Craeybeckx, politician (died 1976)
 Pierre Devaux, athlete (died 1984)
 5 December – Gust De Muynck, broadcaster (died 1986)
 18 December – Fernand Collin, banker (died 1990)

Deaths
 13 February – Gustave Den Duyts (born 1850), artist
 1 March – Jules de Burlet (born 1844), politician
 12 July – Félix Godefroid (born 1818), harpist
 23 September – Isidore-Joseph du Rousseaux (born 1826), bishop of Tournai
 22 November – Frans Verhas (born 1827), painter

References

 
1890s in Belgium